WTAC-TV, UHF analog channel 16, was an ABC-affiliated television station licensed to Flint, Michigan, United States. The station was owned by the Trendle-Campbell Broadcasting Company.

History

WTAC-TV went on the air on November 26, 1953.  It was owned by the Trendle-Campbell Broadcasting Company which was a partnership of George W. Trendle (creator of The Lone Ranger) and H. Allen Campbell which also owned WTAC (AM) which is now WSNL in Flint. The station went out of business less than a year later, on Friday, April 30, 1954, in the middle of ABC's coverage of the Army-McCarthy hearings, because too few TVs at the time were equipped to receive UHF channels. The broadcast tower was destroyed in a tornado in 1956.  The WTAC-TV studios at 2302 Lapeer Road in Flint became the WJRT-TV studios in 1958.

Today, the signal space for channel 16 is home to WSMH's digital signal, which remains on channel 16 after that station shut down its analog signal May 21, 2009, and following the nationwide analog television shutdown that took place June 12, 2009.

Defunct television stations in the United States
Television channels and stations established in 1953
1954 disestablishments in Michigan
1953 establishments in Michigan
Television channels and stations disestablished in 1954
TAC-TV
TAC-TV